William Holcombe (July 22, 1804 – September 5, 1870) was a United States Democratic politician and the first Lieutenant Governor of Minnesota. He was born in Lambertville, New Jersey and died in Stillwater, Minnesota; Holcombe was mayor of Stillwater, when he died.

He was a member of first Minnesota Legislature.  His term as Lieutenant Governor did not expire until a few weeks after the 2nd Minnesota State Legislative Session began. Although the Republican Party had a majority in the Minnesota Senate, Holcombe, a Democrat, presided over them until January 2, 1860 when the state officials were sworn in. Some of his rulings so frustrated the Republican majority that they asked the House to impeach him. The House responded that they had no right to interfere with the workings of the Senate and suggested they change their rules. The issue was resolved when Republican Ignatius Donnelly was finally sworn in as Lieutenant Governor.

Notes

External links

1804 births
1870 deaths
People from Lambertville, New Jersey
Lieutenant Governors of Minnesota
Mayors of places in Minnesota
Minnesota Democrats
19th-century American politicians